Michael Samuel Kiwanuka (born 3 May 1987) is a British singer-songwriter and record producer who is signed with Polydor Records. His 2012 debut album, Home Again, went gold in the United Kingdom and his second album, Love & Hate, debuted in 2016 at number one. He has been nominated for numerous honours, including the Brit Awards, MTV Europe Music Awards, BBC Music Awards, and The Grammy Awards. In January 2012, he won the BBC's Sound of 2012; and, in September 2020, he won the Mercury Prize.

Early life
Born and raised in Muswell Hill, London, Kiwanuka is the son of Michael and Deborah, Ugandan parents who escaped the Amin regime. He attended Fortismere School, leaving there in 2005 after completing his A-Levels. He went on to study at the School of Media, Arts and Design at the University of Westminster.

Career

Early years
Kiwanuka worked as a session guitarist, playing with Chipmunk and Bashy before working as a solo artist. His first proper gig was at The Oxford in Kentish Town at age 22. He came to the attention of Communion Records, which released his first two EPs, including his debut Tell Me A Tale on 13 June 2011.

2011–2016: Home Again and Love & Hate
Kiwanuka supported Adele on her Adele Live 2011 tour, as well as at her iTunes Festival 2011 gig, and played at the 2011 Hard Rock Calling.

In 2011, he signed a deal with Polydor Records. He was included in the BBC's Sound of 2012 poll and was named as the winner on 6 January 2012. In June 2012, he was illustrated in a BBC article regarding Spain vis-à-vis Uganda during the Eurozone crisis; his putative counterpart was actress Penélope Cruz.

Kiwanuka released his debut studio album, Home Again, in 2012 to positive reviews from critics. The album peaked at number 4 in the UK and, as of 2012, has sold over 70,000 copies in the UK.

After scrapping an entire second album (due to be called Night Songs) after he was discouraged by an A&R man, in 2016, Kiwanuka released his follow-up to Home Again, Love & Hate. The album was a critical and commercial success, reaching number 1 on the UK albums chart. The album was produced by Danger Mouse and spawned several singles.

2018–2019: Collaborations and Kiwanuka 
Kiwanuka recorded a track with UNKLE for the 2018 Roma companion album ('On My Knees'). After another collaborative song and video, this time with Tom Misch, was released in June 2019 ('Money'), his single, You Ain't the Problem preceded his third album Kiwanuka which was released in November 2019, again to further critical and commercial success. The album placed at number 2 in the UK charts, has been gold-certified for over 100,000 sales and would go on to win the UK Mercury Music Prize for 2020, his first win after his first two albums were only nominated. Danger Mouse was involved with the album, along with producer Inflo. Kiwanuka said that the choice of album name reflected his increasing confidence in being himself.

Kiwanuka played himself in a musical appearance in the 2019 film Yesterday.

Musical style
Kiwanuka has acknowledged influences from musicians such as Jimi Hendrix, The Beatles, The Rolling Stones, Pink Floyd,Nirvana, Ray Charles, Bill Withers, Otis Redding, Jack Johnson, Chuck Berry, Pops Staples, The Band, Joni Mitchell, Bob Dylan, Frank Zappa, Neil Diamond, Eric Clapton, Joe Cocker, Eric Bibb, Tommy Sims, Dobie Gray, Wham!, Richie Havens, Sly and the Family Stone, and Funkadelic. He has played with James Gadson, who drummed for Bill Withers.

Among others, Kiwanuka’s musical style has been compared to Bill Withers and Terry Callier.

Personal life
Kiwanuka is a lifelong fan of Tottenham Hotspur F.C. He moved out of London to Southampton shortly before the release and promotion of his third album.

Kiwanuka has openly stated he has struggled with anxiety and other mental health issues.

Kiwanuka is a Christian, and has grown up within the church. He married Christian musician Charlotte Kiwanuka in 2016.

Discography

 Home Again (2012)
 Love & Hate (2016)
 Kiwanuka (2019)

Awards and nominations

References

Notes

External links

 
 

1987 births
Living people
British soul singers
21st-century Black British male singers
British people of Ugandan descent
People from Muswell Hill
Alumni of the University of Westminster
Polydor Records artists
English male singer-songwriters
English Christians